John Wilson Gladstone (born 25 December 1945) was the Moderator of the Church of South India as well as Bishop of South Kerala.

Early years
Rev. Dr. Gladstone was born on 25 December 1945 in Travancore. into a pastoral family.  His father, Rev. J. Wilson, was a Pastor of the CSI

He had an inclination towards priesthood and after his schooling pursued bachelor's and master's degrees in economics in Thiruvananthapuram.

Divinity and higher studies
In 1969, Rev. Dr. Gladstone joined the United Theological College [UTC, Bangalore – the only autonomous college under the Senate of Serampore College] where he received a Bachelor of Divinity degree.
After finishing his studies in divinity in 1972 he again enrolled at UTC where, in 1975, he obtained a Master of Theology degree in the discipline of church history.

Ordination and lecturership
After returning from Bangalore, Rev. Dr. Gladstone was ordained as a priest of the Diocese of South Kerala of the Church of South India on 20 July 1975.

The diocese designated him as Youth Pastor and thereafter, Gladstone was assigned a teaching task at the Kerala United Theological Seminary, [KUTS – affiliated to the Senate of Serampore College] Thiruvananthapuram.

Research studies
Later in the year 1978, Rev. Dr. Gladstone took study leave from KUTS and proceeded to the University of Hamburg in Germany for research studies in church history.

In 1983, the University of Hamburg awarded him a Doctorate of Theology degree magna cum laude.  His doctoral thesis was entitled Protestant Christianity and People's Movements in Kerala, 1850–1936 which was later published by the KUTS, Thiruvananthapuram in 1984.

Return to KUTS
Subsequently, Rev. Dr. Gladstone returned to Thiruvananthapuram to resume his teaching responsibilities.  In 1991 he became Principal of the KUTS, Thiruvananthapuram.

Works

Church historian
Rev. Dr. Gladstone is a member of the Church History Association of India (CHAI), a body of church historians and has published more than 100 articles.

Senate responsibilities
Rev. Dr. Gladstone served as the President of the Senate of Serampore College, India's first university, from 2000 to 2005

Bishopric
On 16 September 1997, Rev. Dr. Gladstone was consecrated as the Bishop in South Kerala.

Moderatorship
During the XXXI session of the synod of the CSI held in Visakhapatnam from 11–14 January 2008, Rev. Dr. Gladstone was elected as the Moderator of the CSI for a biennium. He succeeded the Most Reverend B. P. Sugandhar (Bishop-in-Medak).

Memberships and honours

Memberships
 Church History Association of India

Honours
In 2005, Rev. Vinod Victor and Rev. Gideon Sobhanam brought out a festschrift in honour of Gladstone entitled Shepherd of a Pilgrim People: Essays in Honour of Bishop J. W. Gladstone''

In 2008 Canterbury Christ Church University, (established in 1962 by the Church of England with degree granting authority), admitted Rev. Dr. Gladstone to its honorary fellowship at Canterbury Cathedral on 1 February.

References

People from Thiruvananthapuram district
20th-century Anglican bishops in India
21st-century Anglican bishops in India
Anglican bishops of South Kerala
1945 births
Living people
Indian Christian theologians
University of Hamburg alumni
Senate of Serampore College (University) alumni
Academic staff of the Senate of Serampore College (University)
Moderators of the Church of South India